Abdelkabir "Abdel" Abqar (born 10 March 1999) is a Moroccan footballer who plays for Spanish club Deportivo Alavés as a central defender.

Club career
Born in Settat, Abqar joined Málaga CF's youth setup in 2017 from Mohammed VI Football Academy. He made his senior debut with the former's reserves on 12 November 2017, starting in a 0–1 Tercera División away loss against CD Huétor Tájar.

Abqar made his first-team debut on 11 September 2018, starting in a 1–2 home loss against UD Almería for the season's Copa del Rey. It was his maiden appearance for the main squad, as he continued to feature regularly with the B's and suffering relegation at the end of the campaign.

On 22 July 2020, Abqar signed for another reserve team, Deportivo Alavés B in Segunda División B. He first appeared with the main squad on 30 November 2021, playing the entire second half in a 3–0 away win over Unami CP, also for the national cup.

International career 
On 13 March 2023, Abqar was called up to the full squad by manager Walid Regragui, for friendlies against Brazil and Peru.

References

External links

1999 births
Living people
People from Settat
Moroccan footballers
Association football defenders
Segunda División B players
Tercera División players
Tercera Federación players
Atlético Malagueño players
Málaga CF players
Deportivo Alavés B players
Deportivo Alavés players
Moroccan expatriate footballers
Moroccan expatriate sportspeople in Spain
Expatriate footballers in Spain